The East and Central African Championships was an annual international athletics competition between nations in East and Central Africa.

The event was established as the East African Championships in 1955, building upon of international athletics matches between Kenya and Uganda (first held in 1934), which had themselves expanded to include Tanganyika in 1952. The competition remained between these countries (with Tanzania replacing Tanganyika after it merged with Zanzibar) until 1969, at which point Tanzania's southern neighbour Zambia was invited. Zambia became the first host outside of the founding three nations shortly after, with the 1971 championships being held in its capital Lusaka. More countries joined in the 1970s, including Ethiopia, Somalia, and this was expanded again in the 1980s (including Djibouti, Egypt, Zimbabwe, Mozambique). Somalia hosted the 1977 edition and the Egyptian capital Cairo was the venue in 1982 and 1985.

The championships had its final edition in 1990, with the absence of founding nation Kenya indicating the lack of support for its continuation. It had lasted for 32 editions from its inception, having been missed in the years 1962, 1966, 1978 and 1980.

Editions

Events
By the latter years of the championships, a total of 35 athletics events had been regularly contested, 20 by men and 15 by women.

Track running
100 metres, 200 metres, 400 metres, 800 metres, 1500 metres, 3000 metres (women only), 5000 metres (men only), 10,000 metres (men only)
Obstacle events
100 metres hurdles (women only), 110 metres hurdles (men only), 400 metres hurdles, 3000 metres steeplechase (men only)
Jumping events
Pole vault (men only), high jump, long jump, triple jump (men only)
Throwing events
Shot put, discus throw, javelin throw, hammer throw (men only)
Relays
4 × 100 metres relay, 4 × 400 metres relay

Events were contested over imperial distances up to 1968.

A men's marathon was contested between 1968 and 1981, with the first race being held separately from the main championships. Combined events featured at the 1972 edition, with Uganda's Alex Ochen taking the honours in the men's decathlon and his compatriot Budesia Nyakecho doing so in the women's pentathlon. Men's 20 kilometres race walks were held between 1975 and 1981, with Ethiopians Hunde Ture  (1975, 1979) and Shemsu Hassan (1981) winning these events.

Women were present at the championships at least as early as 1967, with eleven women's events being contested that year. In 1970, a women's 1500 m and 4 × 400 m relay was added and the 80 metres hurdles was replaced by the international standard 100 m distance. A 3000 m for women was first held in 1976 and a women's 400 m hurdles in 1979. A women's 5000 m was first held in 1986 (won by Kenya's Susan Sirma), though it is not known if this was contested in any of the other later editions.

Men's champions

Sprints

Distance events

Hurdling

Jumps

Throws

Relays

Marathon
1968:  (2:23:39†)
1969:  (2:33:06A)
1970:  (2:18:49A)
1971:  (2:21:22A)
1972:  (2:39:23)
1976:  (2:13:25)
1977:  (2:18:55)
1979:  (2:22:13)
1981:  (2:17:35)

Women's champions

Sprints

Distance events

 Women's 3000 m was not contested in 1986 and instead a women's 5000 m was held.

Hurdles and jumps

Throws

Throws

Relays

References

Athletics competitions in Africa
International athletics competitions
Sport in East Africa
Sport in Central Africa
Recurring sporting events established in 1955
Recurring sporting events disestablished in 1990
1955 establishments in the British Empire
1955 establishments in Africa
1990 disestablishments in Africa
Defunct athletics competitions